Aimilianos is a village in the municipality of Grevena, northern Greece. Before the local government was reformed in 1997, it was a part of the community of Agioi Theodoroi. , there are 36 residents in the village. Aimilianos is a part of the local community of Agioi Theodoroi.

See also
 List of settlements in the Grevena regional unit

References

Populated places in Grevena (regional unit)